The Yolla gas field is a natural gas field in Bass Strait, Australia, lying 147 km off the south coast of Victoria. It is a part of Bass Basin.  It was discovered in 1985 and developed by Origin Energy and its joint venture partners AWE Petroleum, CalEnergy and Wandoo Petroleum as the BassGas Project.  It began production in June 2006 through an 8,000 tonne unmanned offshore platform standing in water 80 m deep.  It produces natural gas, condensates and LPG which are piped ashore to be processed near Lang Lang in Gippsland.

References

Natural gas fields in Australia
Bass Strait
Energy in Victoria (Australia)